The Ashley-Alexander House (also known as the Alexander House) is a historic house located at 3514 Walkers Corner Road (Arkansas Highway 161) near Scott, Arkansas.

Description and history 
The Ashley-Alexander House outside Little Rock is a -story clapboarded log structure, built out of hand-hewn cypress logs and topped by a gable roof, set near the east side of the road. A porch projects from the center of the five-bay facade, with a two-window dormer above, and flanking shed-roof dormers flanking it on the main roof.

Originally dubbed the Ashley's Mill Plantation, the home was built around 1835 by Chester Ashley, one of Arkansas's early United States Senators from 1844 to 1848, and a prominent lawyer and local landowner as well as co-founder of the Rose Law Firm.  Ashley died in 1848.

In December 1898, Arthur Lee Alexander and his wife, Otelia George Alexander, purchased the property for $35,000.

The house is 5,400 square feet with 6 bedrooms & 4 bathrooms. The house is supposedly haunted.

The house was listed on the National Register of Historic Places on June 18, 1976.

See also
National Register of Historic Places listings in Lonoke County, Arkansas

References

Houses on the National Register of Historic Places in Arkansas
Houses completed in 1835
Houses in Lonoke County, Arkansas
National Register of Historic Places in Lonoke County, Arkansas